State Route 759 (SR 759) is a short state highway in Douglas County, Nevada serving the county's airport facility.

Route description

From there, the highway heads east along Airport Road past some farm fields and businesses.

History
SR 759 was designated during the 1976 renumbering of Nevada's state highway system on July 1, 1976. The change was first seen on state highway maps in 1991.

Major intersections

See also

References

759
Transportation in Douglas County, Nevada